Saminé is a small town and rural commune in the Cercle of Ségou in the Ségou Region of southern-central Mali. The commune includes the town and 5 villages in an area of approximately 197 square kilometers. In the 2009 census it had a population of 12,082. The Bani River runs along the southern boundary of the commune. The town of Saminé, the chef-lieu of the commune, is 41 km south-southeast of Ségou.

References

External links
.
.

Communes of Ségou Region